Death on the Boat Train is a 1940 detective novel  by John Rhode, the pen name of the British writer Cecil Street. It is the thirty second in his long-running series of novels featuring Lancelot Priestley, a Golden Age armchair detective. As in most of the later novels much of the detective footwork is done by Inspector Waghorn of Scotland Yard. The construction of the murder setting bears similarities to Death in the Tunnel, written by Street under his other pen name Miles Burton. With is focus on seemingly unbreakable alibis and railway and ship timetables, it is also similar in style to the Inspector French novels of Freeman Wills Crofts.

Synopsis
A passenger in a private compartment on the boat train from Southampton to London Waterloo is found dead with a needle puncture in is back. He had travelled on Guernsey on a channel steamer but investigating officers are hard-pressed to find either a motive or an opportunity for the killing.

References

Bibliography
 Evans, Curtis. Masters of the "Humdrum" Mystery: Cecil John Charles Street, Freeman Wills Crofts, Alfred Walter Stewart and the British Detective Novel, 1920–1961. McFarland, 2014.
 Magill, Frank Northen . Critical Survey of Mystery and Detective Fiction: Authors, Volume 3. Salem Press, 1988.
 Reilly, John M. Twentieth Century Crime & Mystery Writers. Springer, 2015.

1940 British novels
Novels by Cecil Street
British crime novels
British mystery novels
British detective novels
Collins Crime Club books
Novels set in London
Novels set in Hampshire